Back 2 Base X (written as B∆CK 2 B∆SE X) is the fifth studio album by American rock band Hed PE. Released on June 6, 2006, it is the band's first release on Suburban Noize.

Music 

Back 2 Base X was influenced by classic punk bands such as the Sex Pistols and the Clash, and was intended as a return to the basics of rock music, and did not rely as heavily on studio enhancement as previous releases.

Reception 

Back 2 Base X peaked at #12 on the Top Independent Albums chart, #154 on the Top Internet Albums Chart and at #154 on the Billboard 200.

Allmusic's Rob Theakston wrote that "Back 2 Base X suffers from the same problems as Amerika: it tries to be conceptual in thought à la Tool and vicious in its political commentary à la Fugazi or System of a Down, but somehow falls short by sounding like an angry stoner on a soapbox. It won't win any new fans, but existing fans of (hed) pe's work won't be turning their backs away from the band in anger anytime soon, either."

Track listing

Personnel

(Hed) Planet Earth
Jahred Gomes – vocals
Jaxon Benge – guitar
Doug «DJ Product © 1969» Boyce – turntables
Mark «Mawk» Young – bass
Mark «Moke» Bistany – drums

Production
Produced by Jahred Gomes, Kevin Zinger & Brad Xavier
Recorded @ Jared's Huntington Beach Apartment
Mixed & mastered by Patrick «P-Nice» Shevelin
Additional vocals by The Rabbi Michael Zimmerman (2, 10, 11)
Additional guitar by Ray Bones (3) & Heath (1)
Additional bass by Heath (1)
Additional composer: Michael Todd (9, 12)
Management by Kevin Zinger
Art concept by Jahred Gomes
Artwork & layout design by Larry Love

References 

2006 albums
Hed PE albums
Suburban Noize Records albums